The Robert Award for Best Actress in a Supporting Role is one of the merit awards presented by the Danish Film Academy at the annual Robert Awards ceremony. The award has been handed out since 1984.

Honorees

1980s 
 1984:  for 
 1985: Aase Hansen for Twist and Shout
 1986: Kirsten Olesen for 
 1987: Sofie Gråbøl for The Wolf at the Door
 1988: Lene Brøndum for Pelle the Conqueror
 1989: Harriet Andersson for

1990s 
 1990: Helle Ryslinge for 
 1991: Kirsten Olesen for 
 1992: Jessica Zandén for Freud's Leaving Home
 1993: Ghita Nørby for Sofie
 1994: Anne Marie Helger for 
 1995:  for Nightwatch
 1996: Birthe Neumann for 
 1997: Katrin Cartlidge for Breaking the Waves
 1998: Ellen Hillingsø for Sekten
 1999: Birthe Neumann for Festen

2000s 
 2000: Sofie Gråbøl for Den eneste ene
 2001: Ann Eleonora Jørgensen for Italiensk for begyndere
 2002: Birthe Neumann for Fukssvansen
 2003: Paprika Steen for Elsker dig for evigt
 2004: Ghita Nørby for The Inheritance
 2005: Trine Dyrholm for In Your Hands
 2006: Charlotte Fich for Drabet
 2007: Stine Fischer Christensen for Efter bryllupet
 2008:  for The Art of Crying
 2009:  for To verdener

2010s 
 2010:  for Deliver Us from Evil
 2011: Bodil Jørgensen for Smukke mennesker
 2012: Charlotte Gainsbourg for Melancholia
 2013: Trine Dyrholm for En kongelig affære
 2014: Susse Wold for The Hunt
 2015: Danica Curcic for Silent Heart
 2016: Trine Dyrholm for 
 2017: Sofie Gråbøl for Der kommer en dag
 2018:  for Winter Brothers
 2019: Jessica Dinnage for Den skyldige

2020s 
 2020:  for Daniel
 2021:  for Shorta

See also 

 Bodil Award for Best Actress in a Supporting Role

References

External links 
  

1984 establishments in Denmark
Awards established in 1984
Film awards for supporting actress
Actress in a Supporting Role